Ruud Janssen (born July 29, 1959 in Tilburg) is a Dutch Fluxus and mail artist currently living in Breda in the Netherlands.

Life and Work
Janssen studied physics and mathematics before he became active with mail art in 1980, doing several international mail art projects. From 1994 till 2001 he has conducted interviews with Fluxus and mail artists. These interviews have been published in booklets and on the internet since 1996. In later years, Janssen focused on acrylic painting and individual correspondences.

Janssen was selected to publish an essay as one of eleven contemporary "New Fluxus" artists who are seen to 'inhabit the site of Fluxus, developing and interpreting the Fluxus tradition in a new way.' in a special double issue of the journal Visible Language on Fluxus.

In 1994, Janssen began a series of mail-interviews. He interviewed Fluxus  and mail art personalities by using all the communication-forms that were available (fax, e-mail, envelope, personal meeting, telephone). The question traveled by one form and the answer could be sent back in another form. This concept resulted in a series of mail-interviews. These interviews were published in booklet-form and the complete texts are also available online. In 2008, a selection of the mail-interviews were published in book form.

In 1997 Janssen had a solo exhibition of his mail art work and interviews in Guy Bleus' E-Mail Art Archives (Provincial Center for Visual Arts, now Z33) in Hasselt, Belgium.

TAM-Publications
Janssen publishes articles, magazines and booklets with his TAM-Publications and participates in international mail art projects, collaborations and exhibitions.

International Union of Mail-Artists
He founded IUOMA (International Union of Mail-Artists) in 1988 and is also the curator of the TAM-Rubberstamp Archive, the result of a Mail Art collection that has been accumulated by him from 1983 till now. The archive contains art prints, original rubber stamps, magazines and literature.

Fluxus Heidelberg Center
In 2003 Janssen and Litsa Spathi founded the Fluxus Heidelberg Center for which they are building up a collection of Fluxus material and where they also publish their own works.

Publications

References

External links
Official site of Ruud Janssen, IUOMA and TAM-Publications
Fluxus Heidelberg Center website

1959 births
Living people
Fluxus
Dutch bloggers
People from Tilburg